The Kaohsiung Astronomical Museum is an astronomical museum in Siaogang District, Kaohsiung, Taiwan.

History
The museum was established in 2000.

Features
The museum has a 2-meter-diameter constellation map, which is the largest ever created in Chinese, and contains the NT$6 million Temma Mewlon 300mm reflector telescope, the most developed telescope ever owned by a museum or organization other than the research institutes in Taiwan.

Transportation
The museum is accessible within walking distance South West from Kaohsiung International Airport Station of the Kaohsiung MRT.

See also
 List of museums in Taiwan

References

2000 establishments in Taiwan
Astronomy museums in Taiwan
Museums established in 2000
Museums in Kaohsiung
Science museums in Taiwan